The 2015 FIA GT World Cup was the race's inaugural edition and the eighth time Grand Touring (GT) sports car machinery participated in Macau's autonomous territory. On November 22, it was staged in the streets of the city as a non-championship race as part of the GT Asia Series in GT3-spec cars. The Automobile General Association Macau-China appointed the Stéphane Ratel Organisation (SRO) to assist in establishing a grid. The race itself consisted of two races: a 12-lap qualification race that determined the starting grid for the 14-lap main race.

Mercedes AMG Driving Academy driver Maro Engel won the main race from pole position after winning the Qualification Race the previous day after on-track victor Edoardo Mortara was penalised ten seconds for brake testing him. Mortara accelerated faster than Engel during the rolling start, but he quickly lost the lead to the former. Engel then dominated the rest of the race, which was stopped two laps early due to a multi-car accident behind the safety car, and the result was recalculated two laps back.  René Rast finished second in his Audi R8 LMS, while Stefan Mücke completed the podium in his Craft-Bamboo Racing entered Aston Martin Vantage V12.

Entry list and rules
To enter the FIA GT World Cup in Macau, drivers had to compete in a Fédération Internationale de l'Automobile (FIA)-regulated championship based on GT3 regulations. On 11 September 2015, Audi, Aston Martin, Mercedes-Benz, McLaren and Porsche were announced as the five manufacturers accepted to enter the event that was open to any car model meeting GT3 rules. Manufacturers could enter up to three drivers through privateer teams, and the teams representing manufacturers could field both gold and platinum ranked drivers; bronze and silver-rated entrants were considered on a case-by-case basis by the FIA GT World Cup Committee. On October 7, 2015, the FIA GT World Cup entry list was released. The first list of participants had 22 drivers, including 2014 Macau GT Cup race winner Maro Engel, two-time Macau Grand Prix victor Edoardo Mortara, and 24 Hours of Le Mans co-winner Earl Bamber. René Rast, a World Endurance Championship participant, was called in as a late replacement for Laurens Vanthoor, who withdrew from the race on doctor's orders after injuring his hip at the Misano World Circuit's Blancpain Sprint Series round.

Background

The 2015 FIA GT World Cup was the event's maiden running and the eighth time Grand Touring (GT) cars contested in Macau. It took place on November 22, 2015, at the 6.2 km (3.9 mi) 22-turn Guia Circuit, after three days of practise and qualifying. The motorsport promoter Stéphane Ratel Organisation (SRO) elected not to renew its contract with the FIA two years before the 2015 FIA GT World Cup, and in early 2013, the SRO's founder, Stéphane Ratel, proposed creating a race for the finest teams and drivers. These proposals were dormant for a while until an FIA World Motor Sport Council meeting in Doha saw the idea resurface and eventually confirmed by the sport's governing body on 20 March 2015. It was the first collaboration between Ratel and the FIA since the FIA GT1 World Championship disbanded. The FIA GT World Cup was granted its status after the World Touring Car Championship stopped travelling to Macau, and it replaced the Baku World Challenge which was discontinued that year when Formula One announced it would hold a race in the city from 2016. The Automobile General Association Macao-China, the race's promoter, asked the SRO to assist in forming a grid.

Practice and qualifying

There was one 30-minute practice session each on Thursday afternoon and Friday morning before Sunday's race. Renger van der Zande set the quickest lap for the Mercedes AMG Driving Academy SLS GT3 in the first practise session at 2 minutes, 20.796 seconds, two-tenths of a second faster than anybody else. In second place was his brandmate Engel. Mortara finished third in the lone Audi Sport Team Phoenix R8 LMS entry. Darryl O'Young's Aston Martin V12 Vantage finished fourth. Bamber was the fastest Porsche competitor, finishing fifth. Positions six through ten were filled by Stefan Mücke, André Couto, Keita Sawa, Rast, and Richard Lyons. Engel led for the majority of the second practice session until Mücke passed him with a time of 2 minutes, 20.082 seconds, the fastest lap of the weekend at the time. Van Der Zande finished second, 0.021 seconds slower, with Adderly Fong third Engel was fourth, and Bamber fifth, repeating his first practise session performance.  Positions six through ten were filled by O'Young, Mortara, Álvaro Parente, his teammate Kévin Estre, and Rast.

Friday afternoon's half-hour qualifying session determined the starting order for the qualification race through each driver's fastest lap times. Before he hit an inside kerbstone at Mandarin Corner and lost control of his car, which then drifted into a barrier (the first of three stoppages), Engel was the early leader in qualifying. Engel took responsibility for the collision and apologised to his team. Van Der Zande's crash into a wall at Paiol caused qualifying to be turn red-flagged qualifying for the second time to repair the barriers. With less than 12 minutes remaining. Audi devised a strategy to let Mortara to drive in clear air for a pole position effort. But Cuoto experienced oversteer and severely damaged his car in an incident at Mandarin curve, which ricocheted between the barriers. Cuoto's crash, which left him unhurt, led to the session's third and last interruption. With six minutes left in qualifying, Mortara started recording fast sector times to take provisional pole before Mücke passed him with a lap of 2 minutes, 18.032 seconds. Mücke was joined on the grid's front row by Mortara. Engel's accident left him in third. Rast was fourth, Van Der Zande fifth and O'Young sixth. O'Young's teammate Lyons was seventh. Bamber, Fong and Parente were eighth to tenth, respectively. Estre was the fastest driver not to qualify in the top ten, ahead of teammate Cuoto, Sawa, Marchy Lee, the Thai duo of Pasin Lathouras and Vutthikorn Inthraphuvasak, Dylan Derdaele, Jeffrey Lee, Weng Sun Mok and Philip Ma. John Shen and Jacky Yeung completed the 22 qualifiers.

Qualifying classification

Qualifying race

At the start, Mücke stopped Mortara's overtake to retain the lead into Mandarin turn, before Engel used his straightline speed to pass Mortara for second position approaching Lisboa corner. Rast dropped to fifth as brandmate Marchy Lee gained another position before turning into Lisboa corner. Despite matching his pace earlier in the race, Engel was unable to challenge Mücke because the leader controlled his speed; both men pulled away from the trailing Mortara and Van Der Zande. Fong lost control of his Bentley Continental GT and crashed heavily at the Solitude Esses on the third lap. The safety car was deployed a lap later to neutralise the order because his car was stranded in the centre of the track.

At the lap eight restart, Mücke got away cleanly to lead the race back up to speed, with Engel and Mortara close behind. Simultaneously, fourth-placed Van Der Zande sought but failed to move up the order. Engel had to take evasive action when Mücke accelerated and then abruptly braked. After the race, Engel expressed his surprise at Mücke's actions. The leaders were unable to execute any further manoeuvres, and the margins at the front grew progressively until the qualification race ended. Mücke led the race from start to finish. He was then found to have brake tested Engel in violation of the regulations and was given a ten-second time penalty. Engel was given the victory and took pole position for the main race. Mortara joined him on the grid's front row. Mücke's penalty demoted him to third place. Van Der Zande was fourth, Rast was fifth, and Lyons was sixth. Following closely were Bamber, O'Young, Parente, and Estre, who rounded out the top ten. Sawa, Marchy Lee, Lathouras, Inthraphuvasak, Derdaele, Jeffrey Lee, Sun Mok, Sheng, Yeng, Cuoto, and Ma were the final 21 classified finishers.

Qualifying race classification

Main race
The race began under dry and sunny weather at 12:55 local time. Fong withdrew from the race because his chassis was too damaged from the previous day's qualification race crash. Mortara made a quick getaway after the race's rolling start and stopped Engel's initial pass to take the lead before the Mandarin Oriental corner. Mortara lost the lead to Engel when he steered into the inside as they approached the Reservoir Kink bend. After a brisk start, his teammate van der Zande took second position. Mücke then took third from Mortara before Lisboa corner. Estre collided with Lyon's rear at the turn, and both drivers retired. After crashing into a barrier at San Francisco Bend, Bamber retired on the lap. At the end of the first lap, Engel led teammate Van der Zande, followed by, Mortara, Mücke, Parente, O'Young, Sawa, Marchy Lee and Lathouras. The first five were covered by five seconds with the rest of the field 18 seconds behind them.

At the midway, Derdaele's car had a punctured tyre and retired at Lisboa curve, while Parente lost sixth place to O'Young by having a better exit out of a turn. Meanwhile, Engel extended his advantage over second-placed Van Der Zande when the course of the race altered on lap 12. Van Der Zande was slowed by traffic, allowing Mücke to challenge him for second place heading into Lisboa bend. As a result of the manoeuvre, Mücke struck Van der Zande's vehicle from behind, causing debris to land in Mücke's left rear wheel. The two collided as Mücke passed Van Der Zande on the inside as they approached Lisboa corner on the next lap. Both drivers ran wide under braking, allowing Rast and Mortara of Audi into second and third places. When the safety car was deployed to close the field down following an accident on lap 14, Engel's eight-second lead over Mortara was reduced to nothing. Inthraphuvasak crashed at Paiol corner, leaving his vehicle stranded in the middle of the course.

As everyone waited for additional laps at racing speed behind the safety car, a multi-vehicle accident occurred at Moorish Hill with 2½ laps to go. The lapped Shen struck the tyre barrier, and every driver behind him collided with each other since he blocked the course. Race control decided to stop the race and not restart it, counting back the result by two laps. Engel won the first FIA GT World Cup, his second consecutive victory in Macau after winning the GT event in 2014. Mortara finished second before a 20-second time penalty was enforced by the International Sporting Code for being deemed to have jumped the start, promoting Rast and Mucke to second and third. Off the podium, Van Der Zande, O'Young, Mortara, Parente, Marchy Lee, Sawa and Lathouras, Couto, Jeffrey Lee, Sun, Shen, Ma, Yueng and Inthraphuvasak were the final finishers.

Main race classification

Notes

FIA GT World Cup for Manufacturers
The FIA GT World Cup for Manufacturers award was presented to the manufacturer supplying the cars with a manufacturer entry with the highest number of points after adding the points of its two best cars awarded based on the result of the Main Race.

Scoring system 
To be classified and earn points, entries had to complete 90 per cent of the winning car's race distance. The pole position winner received no points.

Main Race points 

 Notes

 † – Drivers did not finish the race, but were classified as they completed over 90% of the race distance.
 1 – Only the two best highest finishing cars of a manufacturer are able to score points. The result of the lowest finishing car is not included.

See also
 2015 Macau Grand Prix
 2015 Guia Race of Macau

References

External links
 at the Internet Archive

FIA GT World Cup
FIA GT World Cup